Herman George Ouseley, Baron Ouseley Kt (born 24 March 1945) is a British parliamentarian, who has run public authorities, including local councils and is an adviser and reviewer of public services organisations. Lord Ouseley has expertise in equality and diversity issues and is the Chairperson of several charitable organisations as well as being a Patron for dozens of organisations. He has been at the forefront of challenging institutional racism in organisations and is an advocate on behalf of individuals from disadvantaged and deprived backgrounds.

He sat in the House of Lords as a crossbencher from 2001 until his retirement in 2019. He was also included in the 2003 list of "100 Great Black Britons".

Early life
Lord Ouseley was born in Guyana in 1945, and came to England in 1957, when he was 11. He was educated at William Penn School and at Catford College, where he gained a diploma in municipal administration.

Career
Ouseley was a local government officer between 1963 and 1993. He was appointed as the first principal race relations advisor in local government. From 1981, he served as Principal Race Relations Adviser and head of the Greater London Council's Ethnic Minority Unit. He later became Chief Executive of the London Borough of Lambeth and the former Inner London Education Authority (the first black person to hold such an office), responsible for over 1000 schools and colleges across the capital. Ouseley was chair and chief executive in the Commission for Racial Equality from 1993 to 2000.

Since 1996 he has been a director of Brookmight Security and, from 2000, of Focus Consultancy. He was the Managing Director of Different Realities Partnership between 2000 and 2005 and, since then, has been operating as a self-employed management consultant undertaking reviews of organisations' performance and assignments in pursuit of equality and diversity outcomes.

Honours
Ouseley was made a Knight Bachelor in the 1997 New Year Honours for "services to community relations and local government", and was made a life peer as Baron Ouseley, of Peckham Rye in the London Borough of Southwark on 26 June 2001.

Ouseley has 13 honorary degrees: from the Universities of Edinburgh, Sheffield Hallam, Bradford, Leicester, Leeds Met, Warwick, Oxford Brookes, Greenwich, London South Bank, London Metropolitan, North East London, Staffordshire, and Brighton.

Work on racism
In 1993, Ouseley set up the project to tackle racism in football and is the Chairperson of Kick It Out, the internationally acclaimed campaign to make football free from discrimination and abuse and to be more inclusive of people of all backgrounds.

Ouseley did not receive a salary for his work for Kick It Out.

Other activities
Ouseley chairs The Chandran Foundation (formerly Preset Education Charity) since 1997, providing specialist education provision for young people with learning disadvantages. He is a Council Member for the Institute of Relations, a think tank focused on challenging injustices and inequalities. He is also on the board of directors of the Manchester United Foundation and is a lifelong fan of Manchester United and supports his local team Millwall and Dulwich Hamlet, one of the local teams he played for as a youngster.

Works
The System (1981)

Notes

References

External links
 

1945 births
Living people
People's peers
Black British politicians
Crossbench life peers
Guyanese emigrants to the United Kingdom
Knights Bachelor
Life peers created by Elizabeth II